Domnarvsvallen is a football stadium in Borlänge Municipality and the home arena for IK Brage and Dalkurd FF. Domnarvsvallen has a total capacity of 6,500 spectators.

The arena is mostly in wood, and was built in 1925 when IK Brage was founded.

External links

Football venues in Sweden
IK Brage
Sports venues completed in 1925
1925 establishments in Sweden